South Horizons is an underground MTR rapid transit station in Hong Kong, located on Ap Lei Chau in Southern District. The station is located under the junction of Yi Nam Road and South Horizon Drive, and primarily serves residents of the South Horizons private housing estate (its namesake), in addition to Ap Lei Chau Estate and Ap Lei Chau West Industrial Area. The station has a unique shape in the form of a letter Y, and has no overrun track. It opened on 28 December 2016 with the rest of the South Island line.

History
The station was built by the Leighton Asia – John Holland Joint Venture under a contract numbered 904, awarded May 2011, which also included Lei Tung station and sections of running tunnel. It was constructed using the cut-and-cover method.

South Horizons station was opened on 28 December 2016.

Station layout

This underground station has two tracks and an island platform. The station's single concourse is located at the west of the station (near the bumper blocks), with all three exits extending from this concourse.

There are two artworks in the station. Along the glass walls of exits A and B, the work Tree Shadow in the Gridline, by Cheung Wai-lok, features shadows of trees in order to transition the exit passageways between indoors and outdoors. Meanwhile, on platform level, the mosaic Soaring Horizon, created by children overseen by Karen Pow Cheuk-mei, features the surrounding landscape on the horizon, including the sea.

Entrances/exits 
South Horizons station has three exits serving the residential buildings of South Horizons. There are two lifts for exit C.
 A: Ap Lei Chau Estate (using an  footbridge) / South Horizons Phase 1 & 4, Marina Square East Centre
 B: South Horizons Phase 2 & 3, South Horizon Drive, Marina Square West Wing
 C: South Horizons Phase 3 & 4, Yi Nam Road, public transport interchange

References

MTR stations on Hong Kong Island
South Island line
Ap Lei Chau